St. Donatus is a city in Jackson County, Iowa, United States. The population was 120 at the time of the 2020 census. St. Donatus (AKA "Ocho Casera") is known for its status as a Luxembourger village, with historic architecture and views along U.S. Route 52. It is the home of a historic Catholic church, which is dedicated to Saint Donatus of Muenstereifel, the town's namesake. It was formerly named Tete Des Morts, which is the name of a creek that flows through the village.

Geography
St. Donatus is located at  (42.360590, -90.538790).

Demographics

2010 census
As of the census of 2010, there were 135 people, 54 households, and 39 families living in the city. The racial makeup of the city was 97.0% White, 2.2% from other races, and 0.7% from two or more races. Hispanic or Latino of any race were 3.0% of the population.

There were 54 households, of which 29.6% had children under the age of 18 living with them, 59.3% were married couples living together, 7.4% had a female householder with no husband present, 5.6% had a male householder with no wife present, and 27.8% were non-families. 22.2% of all households were made up of individuals, and 11.1% had someone living alone who was 65 years of age or older. The average household size was 2.50 and the average family size was 2.87.

The median age in the city was 44.3 years. 23.7% of residents were under the age of 18; 6.7% were between the ages of 18 and 24; 20.7% were from 25 to 44; 33.3% were from 45 to 64; and 15.6% were 65 years of age or older. The gender makeup of the city was 51.9% male and 48.1% female.

2000 census
As of the census of 2000, there were 140 people, 53 households, and 41 families living in the city. The racial makeup of the city was 100.00% White.

There were 53 households, out of which 30.2% had children under the age of 18 living with them, 69.8% were married couples living together, 7.5% had a female householder with no husband present, and 20.8% were non-families. 18.9% of all households were made up of individuals, and 7.5% had someone living alone who was 65 years of age or older. The average household size was 2.64 and the average family size was 3.05.

In the city, the population was spread out, with 22.9% under the age of 18, 10.0% from 18 to 24, 27.9% from 25 to 44, 17.1% from 45 to 64, and 22.1% who were 65 years of age or older. The median age was 39 years. For every 100 females, there were 109.0 males. For every 100 females age 18 and over, there were 111.8 males.

The median income for a household in the city was $39,750, and the median income for a family was $42,000. Males had a median income of $32,083 versus $16,477 for females. The per capita income for the city was $15,369. There were none of the families and 0.7% of the population living below the poverty line, including no under eighteens and 5.3% of those over 64.

Education
Dubuque Community School District operates local schools covering St. Donatus and areas to the north and west, while Bellevue Community School District operates local area schools covering areas to the southeast.

References

Cities in Jackson County, Iowa
Cities in Iowa
Historic districts on the National Register of Historic Places in Iowa
National Register of Historic Places in Jackson County, Iowa
Historic districts in Jackson County, Iowa
Luxembourgian-American history